River Styx is a literary journal produced in St. Louis, Missouri, and published two times a year by the Big River Association.  It is the oldest literary journal in St. Louis, Missouri.

Early years
River Styx was started in St Louis, Missouri in 1975 after poetry readings and musical sessions among enthusiasts in the late 1960s. At the apartment of Danny Spell, poets read their work and the work of poets they liked. These sessions evolved into the River Styx Poets radio program. Regulars on the show included Michael Castro, Jan Castro, Danny Spell, and Marvin Hohman. The radio program lasted from 1970–1973.

River Styx magazine was founded in 1975 with Michael Castro and Jan Castro as editors. The magazine's approach was multicultural, as were the reading series, which began at the same time, and the River Styx PM series, which began in 1981. Early contributors to the magazine included David Meltzer, Jerome Rothenberg, Maurice Kenny, Joy Harjo, Terri McMillan, and Quincy Troupe. In the 1980s and 1990s Troupe joined the editing team. The magazine included interviews with Ntozake Shange, Gary Snyder, Robert Bly, John Barth, Toni Morrison, and Allen Ginsberg.

River Styx magazine is produced by the literary organization River Styx (originally Big River Association), incorporated as a not for profit organization in 1975 with Michael Castro as president. The organization also produces readings. The readings helped build the magazine's reputation. They were directed by Michael Castro for over twenty years, with one year stints by Jan Castro, Peter Carlos, Ann Haubrich, and Jan Rothschild. These readings included music by Willie Mae Ford Smith with James Baldwin, the World Saxophone Quartet, and St. Louis Symphony musicians Catherine Lehr, Manuel Ramos, and Rich O'Donnell. Local artists from St. Louis attended, as did visiting writers such as Breyten Breytenbach, Dennis Brutus, Carolyn Forche, W.S. Merwin, Toni Morrison, Adrienne Rich, Derek Walcott. Special editions by Arthur Brown and William H. Gass were produced in the 1980s.

In 1995 Richard Newman became editor-in-chief. After Michael Castro left the organization in 2000, Newman became director of the River Styx Poetry Series. In 1986 Jan Castro received the Editors Award for River Styx from CCLM (Coordinating Council for Literary Magazines, now CLMP).

21st Century River Styx
The magazine devotes several pages per issue to artists, which have included Michael Corr, Alejandro Romero, Lynda Frese, Emmet Gowan, John Slaughter, Patte Loper, Birney Imes, Virginia Beahan, Laura McPhee, Deborah Luster, Dana Moore, Benedict Fernandez, and Frank Shaw.

The magazine sponsors two contests each year for microfiction and poetry. Past judges for the International Poetry Contest have included Billy Collins, Philip Levine, Maxine Kumin, and Molly Peacock.

In the fall of 2012, the River Styx reading series moved its venue. A Best of River Styx special edition was published in 2000 to mark the organization's twenty-fifth anniversary. It included poetry, interviews, photographs from readings by River Styx archivist Paul Neuenkirk, and a record insert with highlights from events.

Awards
The magazine has won several Stanley Hanks Prizes, awards from the Coordinating Council of Literary Magazines, as well as grants and support from the National Endowment for the Arts, Missouri Arts Council, Regional Arts Commission, Missouri Humanities Council, and Arts and Education Council. Its poems and stories have appeared in Best American Poetry and New Stories from the South anthologies, Best New Poets, and The Pushcart Prizes: Best of the Small Presses.

Contributors
The magazine has published work by Jacob M. Appel, Margaret Atwood, Jorge Luis Borges, Richard Burgin, Robert Bly, Amy Clampitt, Robert Creeley, Rita Dove, Stephen Dunn, Clayton Eshleman, Martín Espada, William H. Gass, Albert Goldbarth, Allen Ginsberg, Donald Hall, Robert Hass, John Hollander, Jane Ellen Ibur, Rodney Jones, Yusef Komunyakaa, Ted Kooser, Maxine Kumin, Li-Young Lee, Czesław Miłosz, Thylias Moss, Howard Nemerov, Sharon Olds, Octavio Paz, Molly Peacock, Carl Phillips, Adrienne Rich, Jerome Rothenberg, Alan Shapiro, Ntozake Shange, Charles Simic, George Singleton, Gary Snyder, Susan Sontag, William Stafford, May Swenson, Arthur Sze, Wisława Szymborska, Mona Van Duyn, and Derek Walcott.

Staff
Editor: Jason Lee Brown
Managing Editor: Shanie Latham
Founding Editor: Michael Castro
Editor Emeritus: Richard Newman
Contributing Editors: Kelli Allen, Noh Anothai, Adam Berner, Christina Chady, R.M. Cymber, Matthew Freeman, Alex Streiff, Kathy Tun

Annual Microfiction Contest
The magazine holds an annual microfiction (500 words or less) contest with a first prize of $1,000, and the top three stories published in a special issue.

See also
List of literary magazines

References

External links
 River Styx Magazine
River Styx staff, local writers anticipate magazine's 100th issue

1975 establishments in Missouri
Biannual magazines published in the United States
Magazines established in 1975
Magazines published in St. Louis
Poetry magazines published in the United States